The 2019 FIBA Under-17 Oceania Championship was an international under-17 basketball tournament that was held from 18 to 24 August 2019 in Nouméa, New Caledonia. The second U17 tournament held after being rechristened from U18 Oceania to U17 Oceania championships, this served as the direct qualifier for the 2020 FIBA U18 Asian Championship where 2 slots were allotted for FIBA Oceania, though the U18 Asian tournament was eventually cancelled due to COVID-19 pandemic.

 annexed their second straight U17 title, and seventh championship overall by defeating  in the Final, 85–56. Meanwhile,  notched their first ever podium finish by winning the Bronze Medal match against , 87–59.

Hosts selection
On 23 September 2016, FIBA Oceania announced during their board meeting that Nouméa, New Caledonia will be the host of the 2019 edition of U17 tournament.

Tournament format
The teams have been ranked based on the results of the previous FIBA Oceania Youth competitions. On this rankings, the top four teams were placed in Group A and the next four teams in Group B.

The top two teams in Group A are guaranteed to Semi-Finals, while Group A's third and fourth-placed teams will battle the top two teams in Group B in the Qualifying Finals which will determine the Final Four cast.

Participating teams
On 18 August 2019, the following teams have their rosters confirmed during the technical meeting held in Apia, Samoa:

Group Phase
All times are in New Caledonia Time Zone (UTC+11:00)

Group A

Group B

Final round

Bracket

Final standings

Awards

All-Tournament Team
Here are the 2019 FIBA U17 Oceania All-Star Five for the Men's Division:

  Tamuri Wigness
  Paul Tsapatolis 
  Josh Giddey
  Robbie Coman
  Egon Keil

References

External links 
 2019 FIBA U-17 Oceania Championship

2019–20 in Oceanian basketball
2019 in New Caledonian sport
Basketball in New Caledonia
September 2019 sports events in Oceania
International sports competitions hosted by New Caledonia